Jamie Woolford (born 15 November 1974 in Luton, England) is a record producer, engineer, singer-songwriter and touring musician. He is a founding member of rock bands The Stereo, Let Go and Animal Chin. In 2013, he released his first solo record title "A Framed Life In Charming Light" on Get Well Records.

Woolford has produced recordings by bands such as Punchline, the A.K.A.s and the Gin Blossoms.

References

External links
 

Living people
1974 births
British record producers
People from Luton